The Gas and The Clutch is the second album from Canadian Blues-Rock group The Perpetrators. Recorded by Len Milne at Bedside Studios, the album won the Outstanding Blues Album at the 2005 Western Canadian Music Awards and was nominated for a Juno Award.

Track listing
 55th Street Boogie
 She Lets Me Know
 Roller Coaster Love
 One Year Ago
 Sent Me Down the Road
 Scratch the Surfish
 Lovin' In My Baby's Eyes
 Are You Ready for the Country
 You Can't Sit Down
 The Woman I Love

2005 albums
The Perpetrators albums